King's Men is a 1976 Australian TV series about police. It began as a TV movie that so impressed Channel Nine they commissioned a series. It was created by Ron McLean and ran for 13 episodes.

References

External links
King's Men at National Film and Sound Archive
King's Men at IMDb
King's Men at AustLit

Seven Network original programming
1970s Australian drama television series
1970s Australian crime television series
Television shows set in New South Wales
1976 Australian television series debuts
1976 Australian television series endings